The Bow Street Academy for Screen Acting (known simply as Bow Street) previously known as The Factory, Bow Street, is a film and television acting academy in Dublin, Ireland.

It has facilities in Bow Street, Smithfield, having moved from premises in the docklands in 2015. It runs full and part-time courses as well as a Young Screen actors course.

Notable alumni
 Niamh Algar - (The Virtues, Raised by Wolves))
 Jordanne Jones
 Jade Jordan
 Seana Kerslake - (Can't Cope, Won't Cope, The Hole in the Ground)
 Niamh McCormack
 Nika McGuigan - (Can't Cope, Won't Cope)
 Leah McNamara - (Dublin Murders, Normal People) 

 Dónall Ó Héalai - (Arracht)
 Nathan O'Toole
 Ann Skelly
 Emma Eliza Regan

References

External links 
 
 

Education in Dublin (city)
Educational institutions established in 2010
Performing arts education in Ireland
Drama schools in Ireland
2010 establishments in Ireland